Allas-Champagne is a commune in the Charente-Maritime department in the Nouvelle-Aquitaine region of southwestern France.

The inhabitants of the commune are known as Allasiens or Allasiennes

Geography
Allas-Champagne is located in the south of the department of Charente-Maritime in the former province of Saintonge some 10 km north-east of Jonzac and 5 km south-east of Archiac. It can be accessed by road D250 which comes east from the D699 linking Jonzac and Archiac through the village and continuing east as the D250E1 to Brie-sous-Archiac. There is also the D149 which comes from Archiac in the north passing thorough the heart of the commune and the village and continuing south to join the D2 road west of Meux. Apart from the village there are three hamlets in the commune: Godais, Chez Gondre, and La Valade. The commune consists entirely of farmland with the exception of a few very small patches of forest in the south.

The Trefle river flows west through the south of the commune forming part of the southern border before continuing westwards to join the Seugne near Saint-Grégoire-d'Ardennes. A small unnamed stream also rises in the north of the commune and flows west then south to join the Trefle.

Administration

List of Successive Mayors

Population

Distribution of Age Groups
The population of the commune is younger than the departmental average.

Percentage Distribution of Age Groups in Allas-Champagne and Charente-Maritime Department in 2017

Source: INSEE

Education
A public kindergarten is located in the centre of the village.

Sites and monuments
 The Church of Saint-Didier from the 12th century.

Transport

Nearest Railway stations and halts
Jonzac (9 km)
Fontaines-d'Ozillac (halt) (9.9 km)
Clion-sur-Seugne (halt) (13.1 km)
Pons (20 km)
Montendre (21.6 km)

Nearest Airports and airfields
Cognac (21 km)
Angoulême (52.1 km)
Aerodrome of Royan-Médis (52.7 km)

See also
Communes of the Charente-Maritime department

References

External links
Allas-Champagne on the National Geographic Institute website 
Allas-Champagne on Géoportail, National Geographic Institute (IGN) website 
Allas-Champagne on the 1750 Cassini Map

Communes of Charente-Maritime
Arrondissement of Jonzac